PS Pioneer was a Clyde-built paddle steamer launched in 1905, built by A. & J. Inglis at their Pointhouse shipyard for David MacBrayne. She served as a passenger and mail ship between the Kintyre peninsula and the islands Islay, Jura and Gigha for over thirty years.

In 1943, after being laid up for a year, she was requisitioned by the Admiralty and used as a Submarine Command HQ Ship at Fairlie, North Ayrshire. In 1945 the Admiralty purchased her and renamed her HMS Harbinger, but the following year her sponsons and paddles were removed and she was used as a floating laboratory at the Isle of Portland base.

Finally in 1958 she was sent to Rotterdam, Netherlands to be scrapped.

References

1905 ships
Ships built on the River Clyde
PS Pioneer